Christof Wandratsch (born 20 December 1966) is a long distance swimmer from Germany. In 1990 he won the Lake Zurich Swim. In August 2005 he set the world record for the fastest ever swim of the English Channel in a time of 7 h 03 mins, beating the previous record set by Chad Hundeby in 1994 of 7 h 17 mins. Christof came extremely close to beating the record in 2003, failing by just 3 mins, finishing in a time of 7 h 20 mins.

His record was broken by 6 mins in 2007 by Petar Stoychev who set at time of 6 h 57 mins.

References

External links

1966 births
Living people
German male swimmers
Male long-distance swimmers
English Channel swimmers
20th-century German people
21st-century German people